New unionism is a term used to describe moves to broaden the trade union agenda. It has been used twice in the history of the labor movement. Ben Tillett was a prominent leader of the London Dock strike of 1889. He formed the Dock, Wharf, Riverside and General Laborers' Union in 1889, which had support from skilled workers. Its 30,000 members won an advance in wages and working conditions.

History

1880s 
In the British trade union movement in the late 1880s, the new unions differed from the older craft unions in several respects.
They were generally less exclusive than craft unions and attempted to recruit a wider range of workers. To encourage more workers to join, the new unions kept their entrance fees and contributions at a relatively low level. Some new unions, such as the Dockers' Union and the gasworkers developed in the direction of general unionism.
They recruited unskilled and semi-skilled workers, such as dockers, seamen, gasworkers and general laborers
At the outset, the new unions were associated with militancy and willingness to take industrial action, unlike the more conciliatory craft unions. Notable strikes associated were the London matchgirls strike of 1888 and the London Dock Strike of 1889.
Many of the new unions had leaders who espoused socialist ideas. Such leaders included Tom Mann, Ben Tillett, Will Thorne and John Burns.
Later, the traditional view of the new unions as militant, fighting unions informed by socialist politics was modified. Although the new unions sponsored many large strikes in their early years, most, in fact, favored conciliation and accommodation. Similarly, although new union leaders espoused socialism, it was often of a moderate kind.

The most prominent new unions were:
Dockers' Union
National Union of Dock Labourers
Gasworkers Union
National Sailors' and Firemen's Union

1980s–present 
In 1988, US labour relations academic Charles Heckscher published The New Unionism: Employee Involvement in the Changing Corporation, one of a series of influential papers that encouraged the union movement to reconsider questions of industrial democracy. The UK Trades Union Congress ran an ambitious new unionism project from 1997 to 2003, seeking to apply a dual strategy of organizing and partnership in an attempt to reinvigorate the movement. The decline in union membership ended, but the net effect is still subject to debate within the movement.

Unions such as the Service Employees International Union (SEIU) in North America and the Public Services Association (PSA) in New Zealand have combined innovative organizing and partnership combinations with notable success, leading to large and sustained membership gains (about 50% in each case) and increased influence and activism at workplace level. 

An international new unionism network was launched in 2007 to bring unionists and labor supporters together around developing and applying these principles. The network provides fora and other resources for those interested in implementing the agenda.

References

External links

New Unionism Network

Further reading
 Duffy,  A. E. P.  "New Unionism in Britain, 1889–1890: A Reappraisal," Economic History Review (1961) 14#2 pp 306-319
 McAteer, Shane. "The 'New Unionism' in Derry, 1889–1892: A Demonstration of its Inclusive Nature." Saothar 16 (1991): 11-22.  in JSTOR
 Matthews, Derek. "1889 and All That: New Views on the New Unionism." International Review of Social History 36#1 (1991): 24-58.
 Schneer, Jonathan. Ben Tillett: portrait of a labour leader (Taylor & Francis, 1982).

 British trade unions history
 History of labor relations in the United States